Saint-Luc-de-Bellechasse is a municipality in the Municipalité régionale de comté des Etchemins in Quebec, Canada. It is part of the Chaudière-Appalaches region and the population is 485 as of 2009. Originally named Saint-Abdon, it was changed to Saint-Luc-de-Dijon, due to confusion in spelling and difficulties of pronunciation. It was later renamed to Saint-Luc and since 1997, Saint-Luc-de-Bellechasse. Saint-Luc honours Luc Gilbert of Saint-Augustin-de-Portneuf, who would have given an important sum for the construction of the rector.

The source of the Etchemin River is in Saint-Luc-de-Bellechasse.

References

Commission de toponymie du Québec
Ministère des Affaires municipales, des Régions et de l'Occupation du territoire

Municipalities in Quebec
Incorporated places in Chaudière-Appalaches